Fraus tedi is a moth of the family Hepialidae. It is endemic to Victoria, South Australia, Tasmania and Western Australia.

References

Moths described in 1989
Hepialidae